The Student's Romance is a 1935 British musical film directed by Otto Kanturek and starring Grete Natzler, Patric Knowles and Carol Goodner. It was based on the musical I Lost My Heart in Heidelberg, and was part of a trend of operetta films of the mid-1930s. It was made by British International Pictures at Elstree Studios. The film's sets were designed by the art directors Cedric Dawe and Clarence Elder.

Cast

References

Bibliography
 Low, Rachael. Filmmaking in 1930s Britain. George Allen & Unwin, 1985.
 Wood, Linda. British Films, 1927-1939. British Film Institute, 1986.

External links

1935 films
British historical musical films
1930s historical musical films
Films shot at British International Pictures Studios
Operetta films
Films based on operettas
Films set in Heidelberg
Films set in the 1830s
British black-and-white films
1930s English-language films
1930s British films